Burhunka (Ukrainian and Russian: Бургунка) is a village in Beryslav Raion, within Kherson Oblast, Ukraine. It belongs to Tiahynka rural hromada, one of the hromadas of Ukraine.

References

Villages in Beryslav Raion